This article is about the particular significance of the year 1891 to Wales and its people.

Incumbents

Archdruid of the National Eisteddfod of Wales – Clwydfardd

Lord Lieutenant of Anglesey – Richard Davies 
Lord Lieutenant of Brecknockshire – Joseph Bailey, 1st Baron Glanusk
Lord Lieutenant of Caernarvonshire – John Ernest Greaves
Lord Lieutenant of Cardiganshire – Herbert Davies-Evans
Lord Lieutenant of Carmarthenshire – John Campbell, 2nd Earl Cawdor
Lord Lieutenant of Denbighshire – William Cornwallis-West    
Lord Lieutenant of Flintshire – Hugh Robert Hughes 
Lord Lieutenant of Glamorgan – Robert Windsor-Clive, 1st Earl of Plymouth
Lord Lieutenant of Merionethshire – Robert Davies Pryce
Lord Lieutenant of Monmouthshire – Henry Somerset, 8th Duke of Beaufort
Lord Lieutenant of Montgomeryshire – Edward Herbert, 3rd Earl of Powis
Lord Lieutenant of Pembrokeshire – William Edwardes, 4th Baron Kensington
Lord Lieutenant of Radnorshire – Arthur Walsh, 2nd Baron Ormathwaite

Bishop of Bangor – Daniel Lewis Lloyd   
Bishop of Llandaff – Richard Lewis
Bishop of St Asaph – Alfred George Edwards
Bishop of St Davids – Basil Jones

Events
5 April – The United Kingdom Census (the first to record what languages are spoken in Wales by everyone over the age of three) shows there to be 1,685,614 speakers of Welsh in Wales, 54.4% of the population.
12 August – Adelina Patti opens her private theatre at Craig-y-Nos Castle.
date unknown – The South Wales and Monmouthshire Training School of Cookery and the Domestic Arts opens in Cardiff.
Owen Morgan Edwards launches his popular monthly magazine Cymru.

Arts and literature

Awards
National Eisteddfod of Wales – held at Swansea
Chair – John Owen Williams, "Yr Haul"
Crown – David Adams

New books

English language
George Essex Evans – The Repentance of Magdalene Despar and other poems
William Nicholas Johns – History of the Church of S. Gwynllyw (S. Woolos, Newport)
Edward Jones – Y Gymdeithasfa

Welsh language
Charles Ashton – Bywyd ac Amserau yr Esgob Morgan
Thomas Edwards – Darllen a Siarad
Daniel Owen – Enoc Huws

Music

Sport
Football – The Welsh Cup is won by Shrewsbury Town.

Births
4 January – Bryn Lewis, Wales international rugby player (killed in action 1917)
13 February – Kate Roberts, author (died 1985)
14 February – Gwynn Parry Jones, tenor (died 1963)
14 March – Billy Geen, Wales international rugby union player (killed in action 1915)
29 March – Tom Parker, Wales international rugby union captain (died 1967)
8 April – Bill Beynon, British bantamweight boxing champion (died 1932)
9 May – Fred Perrett, Wales international rugby union (died of wounds 1918)
1 October – Morfydd Llwyn Owen, composer, pianist and mezzo-soprano (died 1918)
29 November – Glyn Stephens, Wales international rugby union captain (died 1965)

Deaths
6 January – Hugh Owen Thomas, pioneering orthopaedic surgeon, 57
13 February – William Davies, palaeontologist, 76
25 February – William Frost, harpist 44
26 February – David James Jenkins, shipowner and politician, 66
18 March – John Basson Humffray, politician, 66
2 May – David Lewis Wooding, genealogist, 62
7 May – Edward Herbert, 3rd Earl of Powis, 72
10 May – Thomas Richard Lloyd, Anglican clergyman, 70/71
4 July – John Rowlands (Giraldus), antiquary, author and teacher, 67
5 September – Sir Hugh Owen Owen, 2nd Baronet, politician, 87
26 September – David Charles Davies, Nonconformist leader, 65
29 September – Lewys Glyn Dyfi (Lewis Meredith), preacher and writer, 65
23 November – Evan Evans, academic, 78
18 December – Sir Love Jones-Parry, politician, 59
24 December – Richard Owens, architect, 60

References

 
Wales